Syna Schreiber (born 20 November 1978) is a former professional tennis player from Germany. Up until her marriage in 2003, she competed under her maiden name Syna Schmidle.

Biography
Schreiber was born in Freiburg im Breisgau, the daughter of tennis instructor Wolfram, who began teaching her when she was four.

Aged 14 she received a wildcard into the main draw of a WTA tournament in Leipzig and played her first tour match against Steffi Graf.

In 1997, she won a $25k tournament in Flensburg, and that year reached her career-high ranking of 152 in the world.

As a doubles player, she made WTA Tour semifinals at the 1999 Bol Ladies Open with Barbara Schwartz, and Palermo in 2001, partnering Antonella Serra Zanetti. She won eight doubles titles on the ITF Women's Circuit.

She had her only Grand Slam main-draw appearance at the 2000 US Open, as a qualifier in the women's doubles with Maja Matevžič.

ITF finals

Singles: 9 (3–6)

Doubles: 16 (9–7)

References

External links
 
 

1978 births
Living people
German female tennis players
Sportspeople from Freiburg im Breisgau
Tennis people from Baden-Württemberg